Lasia corvina is a species of fly from the genus Lasia in the family Acroceridae. The species was originally described by Wilhelm Ferdinand Erichson in 1840. It is recorded from Chile and Argentina.

References

Acroceridae
Diptera of South America
Arthropods of Chile
Arthropods of Argentina
Taxa named by Wilhelm Ferdinand Erichson
Insects described in 1840